Charles Franklin Dunbar (born April 1, 1937) is an American former diplomat who was a career Foreign Service Officer. He served in a number of capacities, including Chargé d'Affaires ad interim (Afghanistan) (January 1982 – May 1983), Ambassador Extraordinary and Plenipotentiary to Qatar (October 7, 1983 – March 23, 1985), and Ambassador Extraordinary and Plenipotentiary to Yemen (June 16, 1988 – June 13, 1991).

Early life and education
Dunbar was born in Cambridge, Massachusetts on April 1, 1937.
A.B., history Harvard College, 1959
M.I.A. from the School of International Affairs, Columbia University, 1961
A year of State Department-sponsored graduate study at the Woodrow Wilson School of Public and International Affairs, Princeton University, 1980–81

Career
From 1962 to 1981, he was assigned to the American Embassies in Tehran, Kabul, Rabat, Algiers and Nouakchott, Mauritania as well as the American Consulate in Isfahan, Iran.  Dunbar held several other posts until 1998 when he served as the UN Secretary-General's Special Representative for Western Sahara.

Dunbar went on to serve as President of the nonprofit Cleveland Council on World Affairs from 1993 to 2000.  He was an adjunct professor of political science at Case Western Reserve University, Warburg Professor in International Relations at Simmons College (2001–2004) and professor (later lecturer) in International Relations at Boston University 2004–2012).

Publications
The Unification of Yemen: Process, Politics, and Prospects Middle East Journal Vol. 46, No. 3 (Summer, 1992), pp. 456–476

References

1937 births
Living people
Harvard College alumni
School of International and Public Affairs, Columbia University alumni
Princeton School of Public and International Affairs alumni
Case Western Reserve University faculty
Simmons University faculty
Boston University faculty
American officials of the United Nations
Ambassadors of the United States to Qatar
Ambassadors of the United States to Yemen
United States Foreign Service personnel
20th-century American diplomats